Goniothalamus curtisii is a species of plant in the Annonaceae family. It is a tree endemic to Peninsular Malaysia.

Description
It is a bush or small tree.  It has narrow to oblong leaves with smooth upper surfaces and lightly hairy undersides.  It has solitary flowers with large green sepals.  The petals are yellow with red highlights and covered with velvety hair.  It has numerous anthers.

Reproductive biology
The pollen of G. curtisii is shed as permanent tetrads.

References

curtisii
Endemic flora of Peninsular Malaysia
Trees of Peninsular Malaysia
Least concern plants
Taxonomy articles created by Polbot
Plants described in 1892